Pandhana is a town and a Nagar Parishad in Khandwa district in the Indian state of Madhya Pradesh.

Geography
It has an average elevation of 249 metres (1145 feet).

Demographics

As of the 2011 Census of India, Pandhana had a population of below 15,000. Males constitute 53% of the population and females 47%. Pandhana has an average literacy rate of 64%, higher than the national average of 59.5%: male literacy is 73%, and female literacy is 53%. In Pandhana, 16% of the population is under 6 years old.

Banks 
State Bank of India - Gandi Chowk Pandhana

Bank of Maharashtra - Gandhi chowk Pandhana

IDFC Bank - Front of Sai Temple Pandhana

Education
Jawahar Navodaya Vidyalya, Pandhana.

Govt. Higher Secondary School, Pandhana.

Krishna Academy, Pandhana.

Swami Vivekanand Public School, Pandhana.

Nearby cities
Barwaha, Bhikangaon, Mundi, Nepanagar, Burhanpur, Khandwa, Harsud.

References

Cities and towns in Khandwa district